Langley Secondary is a public high school in Langley, British Columbia part of School District 35 Langley. It is the oldest secondary school in the Langley School District, having been opened in 1949.

Langley Secondary offers programs for students in Grade 9 to 12 and has strong traditions in academics, fine arts and athletics. Langley Secondary has one partner school, the HD Stafford Middle School (grades 6, 7 and 8). Langley Secondary has over 1000 students and 80 staff members. In addition to regular provincially prescribed curriculum leading to graduation, the school has academic programs including AVID and Advanced Placement. The school offers a Fine Arts Intensive Program, sports academies, an alternate academic program (Focus), and BCIT's Piping and Plumbing Program which provides post secondary credit to high school students. In addition to two gymnasiums, a combatant's room and a equipped weight room, the athletics program has access to adjacent fields, a stadium, a track and a lacrosse box.

In popular culture
It has been used as one of the sets for the 2009 horror film, Jennifer's Body, starring Megan Fox and has been used in LifeTime TV's "The Pregnancy Project" along with many other films.

Notable alumni
 Micheal Baldwin: Screenwriter
 Jesse Giddings, television host for E! News and MuchMusic 
 Ryan Knighton, writer
 Billeh Nickerson, writer
 Georgia Ellenwood, heptathlon athlete

References

High schools in British Columbia
School District 35 Langley
Educational institutions established in 1949
1949 establishments in British Columbia